The 2010–11 Oklahoma State Cowboys basketball team represented Oklahoma State University in the 2010–11 NCAA Division I men's basketball season. This was head coach Travis Ford's third season at Oklahoma State. The Cowboys competed in the Big 12 Conference and played their home games at the Gallagher-Iba Arena. They finished the season 20-14, 6-10 in Big 12 play to finish in seventh place. They advanced to the quarterfinals of the Big 12 tournament where they lost to Kansas. They did not receive an at-large invitation to the 2011 NCAA tournament, but did receive an invitation to the 2011 National Invitation Tournament where they lost to Washington State in the second round.

Pre-season

Departures

Recruits

Roster
Source

Midland

Rankings

Schedule and results
Source
All times are Central

|-
!colspan=9 style=| Non-conference regular season

|-
!colspan=9 style=| Big 12 regular season

    

|-
! colspan=9 style=|Big 12 tournament

|-
!colspan=9 style=|NIT

See also
Oklahoma State Cowboys basketball (men's basketball only)
2010–11 Big 12 Conference men's basketball season

References

Oklahoma State
Oklahoma State
Oklahoma State Cowboys basketball seasons
2010 in sports in Oklahoma
2011 in sports in Oklahoma